Vivartavada is an Advaita Vedanta theory of causation, postulated by post-Shankara Advaita advaitins, regarding the universe as an "illusory transformation" of Brahman.

Etymology
The Sanskrit word vivarta (विवर्त) means alteration, modification, change of form, altered condition or state. The term, vivartavada is derived from the word vivarta.

Meaning

All schools of Vedānta subscribe to the theory of Satkāryavāda, which means that the effect is pre-existent in the cause. But there are different views on the origination of the empirical world from Brahman. Parinamavada is the idea that the world is a real transformation (parinama) of Brahman. Vivartavada is the idea that 

The Brahma Sutras, the ancient Vedantins, most sub-schools of Vedānta, as well as Samkhya argue for parinamavada. The "most visible advocates of Vivartavada,", states Nicholson, are the Advaitins, the followers of Shankara. "Although the world can be described as conventionally real", adds Nicholson, "the Advaitins claim that all of Brahman's effects must ultimately be acknowledged as unreal before the individual self can be liberated". 

Yet, scholars disagree on whether Adi Shankara and his Advaita system explained causality through parinamavada or through vivartavada. Scholars such as Hajime Nakamura and Paul Hacker state that Adi Shankara did not advocate Vivartavada, and his explanations are "remote from any connotation of illusion". According to these scholars, it was the 13th century scholar Prakasatman who gave a definition to Vivarta, and it is Prakasatman's theory that is sometimes misunderstood as Adi Shankara's position. Andrew Nicholson concurs with Hacker and other scholars, adding that the vivarta-vada isn't Shankara's theory, that Shankara's ideas appear closer to parinama-vada, and the vivarta explanation likely emerged gradually in Advaita subschool later.

Rejection
Vijnanabhiksu  portrays casual relation as having three terms: unchangeable locus cause, changeable locus cause and effect. The locus cause is inseparable from and does not inhere in the changeable cause and the effect.  

The Pratyabhijna philosophy of Somananda refutes the Arambhvada (the 'Realistic view' of the Nyaya-Vaisesika), the Parinamavada (the theory of Transformation of the Sankhya-Yoga) and the Vivartavada (the theory of Manifestation of the Advaita), by postulating the theory of Svatantryavada (the 'Universal voluntarism')  which states that it is due to the sovereignty of God’s Will that Effect evolves from Cause. 

Whereas Ramanuja accepts Prakrti as the material cause but Madhava rejects this contention since material cause does not mean that which controls and superintends; Madhava also rejects the Vivartavada because it does not accept any effect that has got to be accounted for. In his philosophy of pure non-dualism (Shuddhadvaita), Vallabhacharya also does not support 'vivartavada' and propounds that Maya (or the 'Jagat') is real and is only a power of Brahman who himself manifests, of his own will, as Jiva and the world and there is no transformation of Brahman in doing so, just as a gold ornament still remains gold only. Shuddhadvaita is also therefore known as ‘Avikṛta Pariṇāmavāda’ (Unmodified transformation).

Notes

References

Sources
Printed sources

 
 
 
 

Web-sources

Buddhist philosophical concepts
Hindu philosophical concepts
Vedanta